Neopalthis is a monotypic moth genus of the family Erebidae. Its only species, Neopalthis madates, is known from Mexico and Panama. Both the genus and the species were first described by Herbert Druce in 1891.

References

Herminiinae
Monotypic moth genera